The Snowy Range Lodge, formerly known as the Libby Lodge, is located in the Snowy Range of Medicine Bow National Forest in Wyoming. The three-story log lodge was built in 1925 as the Libby Lodge. From 1925 to the mid-1970s, the Lodge served as a classic mountain lodge, sleeping up to 75 people in the main lodge and in ten cabins on 40 acres leased from the US Forest Service.  In the mid-1970s, it fell into a state of abandonment, neglect, and disrepair such that the Forest Service planned to burn and bulldoze it as it presented a liability risk to National Forest users who might venture inside.

The Lodge was purchased and rehabilitated by a local family and currently serves as a private residence, and private hire for events (not accommodation).

References

External links

Snowy Range Lodge at the Wyoming State Historic Preservation Office

Hotel buildings on the National Register of Historic Places in Wyoming
Houses on the National Register of Historic Places in Wyoming
Houses completed in 1925
Rustic architecture in Wyoming
Hotels in Wyoming
Houses in Albany County, Wyoming
National Register of Historic Places in Albany County, Wyoming